Peter Shier (born August 12, 1955) is a Canadian retired ice hockey defenseman who was an All-American for Cornell.

Career
A graduate of Beaconsfield High School, Shier played junior hockey for the Pierrefonds Pirates. He was twice an all-star for the junior B team and began attending Cornell University in 1974. After a year with the freshman team, one of the few remaining first-year teams in the country, Shier was drafted by the Cincinnati Stingers. When he debuted for the varsity team the following year, Shier became a point-per-game player and increased his point total each season. As a senior Shier led the nation in scoring by a defenseman and helped Cornell to a second place finish in ECAC Hockey. Unfortunately, the team was upset in the conference quarterfinals and missed a chance at a tournament appearance. Later that year, after the Edmonton Oilers had obtained his rights, Shier was offered a contract to finish out the playoffs. Despite the $25,000 on the table, Shier knew that he wouldn't finish his degree if he had accepted and turned down the offer.

After graduating with a degree in hotel management, Shier began playing professionally. He played two seasons for the Oklahoma City Stars and led the team in scoring from the blueline both years. Unfortunately, the Stars weren't a good team and missed the playoff during Shier's tenure. In 1980 he travelled across the Atlantic and played several years in Europe. After a season in Finland, Shier played for two Austrian and one Swiss team over three years, finishing in the top three scorers for his teams each year.

Shier decided to retire after the 1984 season and returned home to begin his business career. When he was playing pickup hockey with Terry O’Malley, the CEO of Vickers & Benson Advertising, the company had just secured a contract with Amstel Brewery and they needed someone who knew the restaurant business. At the start Shier, admittedly, didn't know a thing about the advertising business but accepted the job and began learning as much as he could from O’Malley. Over the years he worked for several agencies including Saatchi & Saatchi and Cossette, Inc. and is currently President and owner of Naked Creative Consultancy (as of 2019).

Statistics

Regular season and playoffs

Awards and honors

References

External links

1955 births
Living people
Ice hockey people from Toronto
Canadian ice hockey defencemen
AHCA Division I men's ice hockey All-Americans
Cornell Big Red men's ice hockey players
Oklahoma City Stars players
Baltimore Skipjacks players
Lukko players
EC Red Bull Salzburg players
HC La Chaux-de-Fonds players
EC KAC players
Cincinnati Stingers draft picks